Ophisops microlepis, the small-scaled lacerta, is a species of lizards found in parts of India.

Distribution and description
Head much depressed; snout long; loreal region concave; upper labials projecting, angular. Upper head-shields smooth; nostril latero-superior, pierced between an upper and a lower nasal; a small postnasal wedged in between the two nasals; these three shields more or less distinctly swollen; fronto-nasal single; pre-frontals obtusely keeled; frontal much narrowed posteriorly, grooved longitudinally; four supraoculars, first and fourth smallest, the two principal separated from the supraciliaries by a series of granules;   occipital small, broader than the interparietal, with which it is usually in contact; subocular bordering the lip, between the fourth and fifth upper labials; temporal scales small, obtusely keeled; two large supra-temporals bordering the parietal; tympanic shield very large, opercle-like. No gular fold; collar usually distinguishable. Dorsal scales small, as large as laterals or slightly larger; 52 to 64 scales round the middle of the body, ventrals included. Ventrals in 6 longitudinal series. A large postero-median pre-anal plate. The hind limb reaches the ear, or between the ear and the eye. 13 to 10 femoral pores on each side. Tail about twice as long as head and body; caudal scales very large. Brown or greyish above, with small black spots which may form a network on the sides; usually one or two pale longitudinal streaks on each side; lower surfaces white. From snout to vent 2.5 inches : tail 5.5.

Found in Bengal, Kachchh, Bilaspur.

Notes

References
 Blanford, W.T. 1870 Notes on some Reptilia and Amphibia from Central India. J. Asiat. Soc. Bengal  39: 335-376
 John, S; Joshi B D; Soni V C 1993 Studies on morphometry, cephalic plates and body scales of Ophisops microlepis Blanford. Journal of Animal Morphology and Physiology 38 (1-2), [June–December 1991]: 191-198

Ophisops
Reptiles of India
Endemic fauna of India
Reptiles described in 1870
Taxa named by William Thomas Blanford